The Icheri Bazar (Qakh Fortress Wall) is located in the center of Qakh city, Azerbaijan. It was built in the first half of 18th century and was renovated by the Russians in the 19th century.

The city block consists of ten brick houses and two  fortress walls.

Images

See also
Qakh (city)

References

Cultural heritage
Azerbaijani culture
Qakh District
Architecture in Azerbaijan
Buildings and structures in Azerbaijan